Pseudocyphellaria crocata is a species of lichen in the family Peltigeraceae of the ascomycetes.

Its predators include the land snail Notodiscus hookeri.

In Iceland, it has been found in only two locations and is classified as critically endangered (CR).

References

crocata
Lichen species
Lichens described in 1771
Taxa named by Carl Linnaeus